Clara Brown was a sternwheel steamboat of the Puget Sound Mosquito Fleet which operated from the late 1880s to the early 1900s, and possibly as late as 1930.

Career
Clara Brown was built in 1886 by Hiram Doncaster, for Capt. Thomas Brown, the owner of the Brown Wharf and Navigation Company.  The vessel was named for Captain Brown's daughter.  The vessel was placed in service on the Henderson Bay route in south Puget Sound and surrounding areas, serving communities such as Olympia, Kalmiche, Shelton, Steilacoom, Tacoma, and Seattle.  The vessel became famous as the first one to reach Seattle with relief supplies after the great Seattle file in June 1889.

References
 Affleck, Edwin L, ed. A Century of Paddlewheelers in the Pacific Northwest, the Yukon, and Alaska, Alexander Nicholls Press, Vancouver, BC (2000) 
 Findlay, Jean Cammon and Paterson, Robin, Mosquito Fleet of Southern Puget Sound, (2008) Arcadia Publishing 

1886 ships
Steamboats of Washington (state)
Passenger ships of the United States
Sternwheelers of Washington (state)